Sandra Adams (born December 14, 1956) is an American politician who was the U.S. representative for . She is a member of the Republican Party. She is a former law enforcement professional who represented District 33 in the Florida House of Representatives. On August 14, 2012, she was defeated in her bid for a second term in the Republican primary election by fellow Congressman John Mica after being redistricted to the 7th district.

Early life, education and career
Adams was born in Wyandotte, Michigan in 1956, moving to Florida in 1964. She served in the United States Air Force. In 1985 she became an investigator for the Orange County Sheriff's Office. Over the next couple of years Adams served as Chair of the Orange County Legislative Delegation and is currently the Chair of the Seminole County Legislative Delegation once more. In 2000, she graduated from Columbia College with a Bachelor of Arts degree in Criminal Justice Administration.

Florida State Legislature

Adams was first elected to the Florida House in 2002. Within her first two years she served as Chair of the Seminole County Legislative Delegation. Adams was the Chair of the Criminal and Civil Justice Appropriations Committee, Vice-Chair of the Criminal/Civil Justice Policy Council, Vice-Chair of the Public Safety/Domestic Security Policy Committee, and Vice-Chair of the Select Committee on Seminole Indian Compact Review. She served on two councils: the Full Appropriations Council on General Government and Health Care and the Rules and Calendar Council.

U.S. House of Representatives

Elections
2010

She filed papers to run in 2009. She defeated Karen Diebel, Tom Garcia, Deon Long and Craig S. Miller in the Republican primary. She was supported by former Alaska Governor and 2008 vice-presidential candidate Sarah Palin. On Election Day, Adams defeated Kosmas, 60%–40%.

2012

Adams originally represented a district that included much of northern Brevard County, including Cape Canaveral and the Kennedy Space Center, as well as portions of Daytona Beach and Orlando.

After redistricting, Adams ran in the newly redrawn Florida's 7th congressional district against fellow U.S. Congressman John Mica in the Republican primary. The new 7th was somewhat more compact than the old 24th, covering much of northern Orlando, as well as most of Seminole County. Adams retained 51 percent of her former territory, while Mica retained 42 percent of his former territory. Ultimately, on August 14, 2012, Mica defeated Adams 60%–40%.

2016

Adams announced her candidacy for the 2016 Republican primary in Florida's 6th congressional district, but she withdrew from the race in January 2016 due to health issues.

Committee assignments
 House Committee on Science, Space and Technology
 House Judiciary Committee

Caucus memberships
 Republican Study Committee
 Tea Party Caucus
 Congressional Sportsmen's Caucus

Personal life
Adams and her husband reside in New Smyrna Beach. They have three children.

See also
 Women in the United States House of Representatives

References

External links

 Congresswoman Sandy Adams archive of official U.S. House website
 Representative Sandra "Sandy" Adams official Florida House of Representatives website
 Sandy Adams for Congress
 
 

1956 births
Living people
American police detectives
Republican Party members of the Florida House of Representatives
Women state legislators in Florida
Female members of the United States House of Representatives
People from Wyandotte, Michigan
People from Orange County, Florida
United States Air Force airmen
Female United States Air Force personnel
Columbia College (Missouri) alumni
Tea Party movement activists
Republican Party members of the United States House of Representatives from Florida
21st-century American politicians
21st-century American women politicians
People from Volusia County, Florida